Idrottsklubben Pantern Known as IK Pantern, were a Swedish ice hockey club based in Malmö. The Club was reformed as IshockeyKlubben Pantern

History
IK Pantern was founded in 1959. On June 23, 1960, the association's first annual meeting was held, whereby Göran Pettersson was elected chairman with Jan Magnusson as deputy, treasurer Lars-Erik Hansson and secretary Berth Danefors with Kjell Olofsson as deputy. The first official match of the Panther was played in December 1960 and ended with a 8-1 victory in over Lund IS. 

The club was in danger of facing an automatic relegation prior to the 2019–20 season due to having insufficient funds in order to meet the requirements to play in HockeyAllsvenskan and later withdrew its place in the league. The league allowed Almtuna IS to fill the void left by IK Pantern. On 7 June 2019, The club IK Pantern filed for bankruptcy.

Season-by-season records

References

External links
Club profile on Eliteprospects.com

Ice hockey teams in Sweden
Sports clubs in Malmö
1959 establishments in Sweden
Ice hockey clubs established in 1959
Ice hockey teams in Skåne County
Ice hockey teams in Malmö